The 2021 Spanish Indoor Athletics Championships was the 57th edition of the annual indoor track and field competition organised by the Royal Spanish Athletics Federation (RFEA), which serves as the Spanish national indoor championship for the sport. A total of 26 events (divided evenly between the sexes) were contested over three days on 19 and 21 February at the Polideportivo Gallur in Madrid.

Results

Men

Women

References

Results
LVII Campeonato de España de PC. Spanish Athletics Federation. Retrieved 2021-04-02.

External links
Official website for the Royal Spanish Athletics Federation

Spanish Indoor Athletics Championships
Spanish Indoor Athletics Championships
Spanish Indoor Athletics Championships
Spanish Indoor Athletics Championships
Sports competitions in Madrid